Australobus is a monotypic genus of Western Australian araneomorph spiders in the family Orsolobidae containing the single species, Australobus torbay. It was first described by Raymond Robert Forster & Norman I. Platnick in 1985, and is only found in Western Australia.

See also
 List of Orsolobidae species

References

Monotypic Araneomorphae genera
Orsolobidae
Spiders of Australia
Taxa named by Raymond Robert Forster